Trouble is the debut and only studio album by British singer Matt Terry. It was released on 24 November 2017. It debuted at No. 29 on the charts. This is the first time that an X Factor UK winner has released their first album with another label instead of with Cowell's label, Syco.

Background
On 11 December 2016, he was crowned as the winner of The X Factor 2016, beating Saara Aalto. He immediately released his winner's single, "When Christmas Comes Around", an original song written by Ed Sheeran, which was not included on Trouble. Following his win, Terry signed with RCA Records.

Singles
"Sucker for You" was released as the album's lead single on 13 October 2017. "The Thing About Love" was released as the first promotional single from the album on 17 November 2017. In February 2018 a music video for "Try" was released.

Other songs
Terry also features on the remix of Enrique Iglesias' song "Súbeme la Radio" alongside Sean Paul. The song is included on the album.

Track listing

Charts

References

2017 debut albums
Matt Terry albums
RCA Records albums